Modular is the fourth studio album by the Spanish electronic indie pop band The Pinker Tones. It was released in Europe on June 8, 2010, and in the United States and Mexico on 29 June 2010 through Nacional Records. Their single "Sampleame" was featured in EA Sports game, FIFA 11.

Track listing

References

The Pinker Tones albums
2010 albums